Slokstallen Mountain is a mountain 1 nautical mile (1.9 km) east of Petrellfjellet in the Muhlig-Hofmann Mountains, Queen Maud Land. Mapped by Norwegian cartographers from surveys and air photos by the Norwegian Antarctic Expedition (1956–60) and named Slokstallen (the millrace barn).

Mountains of Queen Maud Land
Princess Martha Coast